Joseph Asoka Nihal De Silva (born 17 May 1946) was the 42nd Chief Justice of Sri Lanka.

Silva obtained his primary education from St. Anthony's College, Kandy. After graduating from University of Peradeniya in 1971 he joined as an advocate of the Supreme Court in December 1972. He joined the Attorney General's Department on 2 April 1974. He became a Senior Deputy Solicitor General on 1987 and after serving 22 years in the Attorney General's Department he was appointed a judge of the Court of Appeal on 12 October 1995. Chief Justice Asoka De Silva became the President of the Court of Appeal in February 2001 and later elevated to the Supreme Court on 1 August 2001.

On 31 July 2013 he was appointed as a member of the Judges and Magistrates Vetting Board in Kenya, a body established under Kenya's new Constitution to rid the Judiciary of unsuitable judicial officers.

Asoka De Silva has obtained a master's degree in administrative law in 1983/84 from the University of Colombo and has done a postgraduate diploma in criminology at the University of Illinois in the United States.

Services
Lecturer in Sri Lanka Law College
Lecturer in Faculty of Law, University of Colombo
Represented Sri Lanka at the United Nations Conference on Sustainable Development in Brazil
Member of the National Task Force to formulate the National Environmental Policy
International Criminal Tribunal for Rwanda as a permanent judge by the United Nations Secretary General, Kofi Annan on 3 August 2004. He served ICTR as one of the 16 permanent judges in the tribunal in Trial Chamber II.

See also
List of St. Anthony's College, Kandy alumni
Chief Justice of Sri Lanka
International Criminal Tribunal for Rwanda

References

1946 births
Living people
Alumni of St. Anthony's College, Kandy
Sri Lankan Roman Catholics
Chief justices of Sri Lanka
21st-century Sri Lankan people
Presidents of the Court of Appeal of Sri Lanka
Court of Appeal of Sri Lanka judges
Puisne Justices of the Supreme Court of Sri Lanka
Sinhalese judges